Chame is the headquarters of Manang District in the Gandaki Zone of northern Nepal. At the time of the 2011 Nepal census it had a population of 1129 people living in 279 individual households. Manang District is the lowest populated district in Nepal.

2015 Nepal earthquake 
The village was affected by an earthquake on 25 April 2015. Reports from the area indicate that the roads and buildings of the village are damaged.

References

Populated places in Manang District, Nepal
Rural municipalities of Nepal established in 2017
Rural municipalities in Manang District